Pell Mell was an instrumental rock combo, formed in 1980 in Portland, Oregon.

History
The original members were Arni May, guitar, and Jon-Lars Sorenson, bass, from the Portland avant-garde group UHF; and from local Reed College Bill Owen on guitar, and Bob Beerman on drums. This iteration of the group performed and recorded the songs on their first EP release in 1981, Rhyming Guitars, which gave the group exposure over the nation's college radio network. In 1982 the foursome hired a manager, Bruce Pavitt in his pre-Sub Pop career, and did a summer tour of the US, visiting colleges and punk clubs on both coasts. Arni May left the group just as the tour was ready to hit the road, re-birthing Pell Mell as a power trio. This version of the band can be heard on the album Live Cassette, recorded in a Portland club. 

With the tour over and a desire to keep playing, the entire group moved to a single house near Berkeley, California, to continue writing and recording the next album,  Bumper Crop. Some of the unreleased songs from the Rhyming Guitars recording session, added to those from a later session with new member Greg Freeman, were released in 1985 on an album named For Years We Stood Clearly As One Thing. While in Berkeley, more personnel changes took place. Steve Fisk joined as keyboardist, and after making the recordings for the second album, Jon-Lars returned to his career in engineering. 

Over the seventeen years the band existed, it experienced a number of line-up changes and recorded for no less than five labels. The drummer, Bob Beerman remained the only constant member of Pell Mell, but its most permanent and final lineup included other notable musicians like keyboardist Steve Fisk, bassist Greg Freeman and guitarist David Spalding. Fisk is known for his extensive production work as well as his solo music career and work in Pigeonhed and the Halo Benders. Freeman — formerly a member of the Call — was also a producer outside of Pell Mell. David Spalding was the guitar tech for the Call.

Pell Mell's song titled "Nothing Lies Still Long" from the Interstate album featured on HBO's Six Feet Under as recap music. The song was used this way for the entire first and second season, and for most of the third season. The song was also used in the 2001 movie “Joyride” starring Paul Walker and Steve Zahn.

Discography
 Live Cassette (Indoor Records, 1982/ Starlight Furniture Company, 2001)
 For Years We Stood Clearly as One Thing (K Records, 1985)
 The Bumper Crop (SST, 1987)
 Rhyming Guitars EP (Indoor Records, 1981/ SST, 1990)
 Flow (SST, 1991)
 Interstate (DGC, 1995)
 Star City (Matador Records, 1997)

Singles and compilations
 "Catwalk" and "Red Rhythm" on Trap Sampler compilation LP (Trap Records, 1981)
 "The Country and the City" on The Lives of Lhasa compilation LP (Lhasa Productions, 1984)
 "Don The Beachcomber" on Rock Stars Kill compilation CD (Kill Rock Stars, 1994)
 "Bring on the China" (demo version) on Step, Step, Steppin' On Satan's Foot compilation CD (Tedium House Publications, 1994)
 "Nothing Lies Still That Long" on Buy-Product compilation sampler (DGC Records, 1995)
 "Swoon" on Kids in the Hall: Brain Candy film soundtrack (Matador Records, 1996)
 "Conversation" on Nigh compilation CD (Castle Von Buhler, 1997)
 Cloverleaf split 7-inch, w/ Acme Rocket Quartet (Lather Records, 1998)

References

External links
 Official Pell Mell website
 
 https://soundcloud.com/mojackpod/158-pell-mell-the-bumper-crop-w-bob-beerman

American instrumental musical groups
Musical groups from Portland, Oregon
Reed College alumni